The 2005 Bausch & Lomb Championships was a tennis tournament played on outdoor clay courts. It was the 26th edition of the Amelia Island Championships, and was part of the WTA Tier II series of the 2005 WTA Tour. It took place at the Amelia Island Plantation in Amelia Island, Florida, from April 4 through April 10, 2005.

Points and prize money

Point distribution

Prize money

* per team

Singles main draw entrants

Seeds

1 Rankings as of 21 March 2005.

Other entrants
The following players received wildcards into the singles main draw:
  Dája Bedáňová
  Eleni Daniilidou
  Shahar Pe'er
  Nicole Pratt

The following players received entry from the qualifying draw:
  Kateryna Bondarenko
  Kristina Brandi
  Catalina Castaño
  Marta Domachowska
  Marissa Irvin
  Akiko Morigami
  Tzipora Obziler
  Květa Peschke

Retirements
  Émilie Loit (left wrist tendinitis)
  Meghann Shaughnessy (lower back injury)
  Serena Williams (left ankle sprain)

Doubles main draw entrants

Seeds

1 Rankings as of 21 March 2005.

Other entrants

The following pair received wildcards into the doubles main draw:
  Eleni Daniilidou /  Carly Gullickson
  Corina Morariu /  Mary Pierce

The following pair received entry from the qualifying draw:
  Lourdes Domínguez Lino /  Evgenia Linetskaya

The following pair received entry as lucky losers:
  Jill Craybas /  Jennifer Russell
  Janet Lee /  Peng Shuai

Withdrawals
Before the tournament
  Émilie Loit (left wrist tendinitis) → replaced by Craybas/Russell
  Meghann Shaughnessy (lower back injury) → replaced by Lee/Peng

Finals

Singles

  Lindsay Davenport defeated  Silvia Farina Elia, 7–5, 7–5
It was the 2nd title for Davenport in the season and the 47th title in her singles career.

Doubles

  Bryanne Stewart /  Samantha Stosur defeated  Květa Peschke /  Patty Schnyder, 6–4, 6–2
It was the 2nd title for both Stewart and Stosur in their respective doubles careers.

References

External links
 ITF tournament edition details

Bausch & Lomb Championships
Amelia Island Championships
Bausch & Lomb Championships
Bausch & Lomb Championships
Bausch & Lomb Championships